St Peter's Square is a tram stop in St Peter's Square in Manchester city centre, England. It opened on 27 April 1992 and is in Zone 1 of Greater Manchester's Metrolink light rail system. The stop's platforms were extended in 2009. Later redevelopment in 2015–16 demolished the original two side platforms and replaced them with a twin-island platform layout which allows for limited cross-platform interchange.

The stop is the most used on the Metrolink network and lies between Deansgate-Castlefield to the South-West and either Exchange Square, Market Street or Piccadilly Gardens tram stops.

History

Plans for a rapid transit station in St Peter's Square were made in the 1970s; proposals for the abandoned Picc-Vic tunnel envisaged the construction of an underground station to serve both St Peter's and the neighbouring Albert Square. The early proposals for an on-street light rail system in Manchester revived the idea of a station in the square. St. Peter's Square was one of the original city-centre stops to open when Metrolink started operations in 1992, when it consisted of two side platforms and basic shelters. In common with most newly built Metrolink stops at the time, St. Peter's Square had two-level platforms, meaning only a short section of the platforms offered level boarding.

The stop was demolished and rebuilt with a full length platform and improved passenger facilities in November 2009. When a building called Elisabeth House, which had stood between Dickinson Street and Oxford Street since the 1970s, was demolished for redevelopment in 2011 as One St Peter's Square, architects' plans were entered in a competition, which was modified in 2011 to incorporate proposals to improve the Metrolink station. In March 2012 a shortlist of two submissions was made.

The stop closed in 2015 for 14 months to allow a total redevelopment, and re-opened on 28 August 2016 as a four-platform interchange, comprising 2 island platforms, one for inbound services and the other for outbound. This offers same-direction cross-platform interchange. The stop was moved slightly north towards Princess Street, from that of its old location, which was in front of Manchester Central Library. A number of trees were planted within the structure of the platforms to improve the look and feel of the space. The Manchester Cenotaph was also relocated and the entire square has been redeveloped into a new public space. During most of the work, a reduced service ran through the square on a single track - but there were 2 full 2-month closures at the beginning and end of the project. This meant between late June and the end of August 2015 and from 26 June 2016 until 28 August 2016, no Metrolink services ran through the square. The rebuilding work uncovered the remnants of an 18th century church crypt.

Services

Service pattern 

At peak times (07:15 – 19:30 Monday to Friday, 09:30 – 18:30 Saturday):

10 trams per hour to Altrincham
5 trams per hour to Ashton-under-Lyne
5 trams per hour to Bury
10 trams per hour to East Didsbury
5 trams per hour to Eccles
5 trams per hour to Etihad Campus
5 trams per hour to Manchester Airport
5 trams per hour to MediaCityUK
5 trams per hour to Piccadilly
5 trams per hour to Rochdale Town Centre
5 trams per hour to Shaw and Crompton
5 trams per hour to Victoria

Offpeak (all other times during operational hours):

5 trams per hour to Altrincham
5 trams per hour to Ashton-under-Lyne
5 trams per hour to East Didsbury
5 trams per hour to Eccles via MediaCityUK
5 trams per hour to Manchester Airport
5 trams per hour to Piccadilly
5 trams per hour to Rochdale Town Centre
5 trams per hour to Victoria

References

External links

Tram times and station information for St Peter's Square Metrolink station from Manchester Metrolink
St Peter's Square area map

Tram stops in Manchester
Tram stops on the Altrincham to Bury line
Tram stops on the Altrincham to Piccadilly line
Tram stops on the East Didsbury to Rochdale line
Railway stations in Great Britain opened in 1992